Brachytarsophrys orientalis, the Oriental short-legged toad, is a species of litter frog in the family Megophryidae. It is native to Jiangxi and Fujian in southeastern China. It is the easternmost species within the genus Brachytarsophrys, hence the specific name orientalis.

Description
This species is different from other short-legged toads because of its smaller adult size, moderate webbing, and the tadpoles lacking transversal stripes on their chest. Males of this species reach 76.8 to 82.7 mm (3 to 3.3 in) SVL and females reach around 88.6 mm (3.5 in) SVL. The male develops nuptial pads on the dorsal surface of the last and second fingers and calls during August from under rocks in streams.

Habitat and conservation
Males call from hidden positions under rocks.

As of March 2021, this species has not been included in the IUCN Red List of Threatened Species. It is present in two protected areas, Jiulianshan Nature Reserve (its type locality) in Jiangxi and Huboliao Natural Reserve in Fujian.

References

orientalis
Frogs of China
Endemic fauna of China
Amphibians described in 2020